"Push Push" is a single by American singer Kat DeLuna. The song features American singer Akon and was the lead single from DeLuna's album Inside Out. It was released in April 2010 and was a commercial success.

Background
The Akon feature marked the second time DeLuna had worked with him, following their 2007 collaboration "Am I Dreaming". Discussing working with him again, DeLuna told Ed Condran from Asbury Park Press that "he's an amazing singer. He's also a very talented artist. I'm fortunate to work with someone like him."

Music video
The music video for "Push Push" was directed by Sarah Chatfield and also features Akon. It was shot on May 2, 2010 in Atlanta, Georgia and premiered June 16, 2010. DeLuna explained the concept behind the video: [The] concept is basically having people look at me through a kaleidoscope as I show a more mature, fun side of me. And it contains a lot of beauty scenes while keeping the viewers and me on a very personal level because I'm literally focusing on singing to them and inviting them into my world. In this video, DeLuna she wears clothes designed by Christian Siriano, the winner of Project Runway season four.

Track listings
Digital download
"Push Push" - 3:10
CD Single French
"Push Push" - 3:10
"Push Push (Spanish Version)" - 3:15

Release history

Charts

Weekly charts

Year-end charts

References

External links

2010 singles
Song recordings produced by RedOne
Kat DeLuna songs
Songs written by Akon
Songs written by Kat DeLuna
2010 songs
Eurodance songs
Songs written by Giorgio Tuinfort
Universal Motown Records singles
Songs written by Tiwa Savage